Omaha South High School is an information technology and visual/performing arts magnet school which educates students in grades 9–12. It is located in Omaha, Nebraska, United States. Built in the 1930s, it is one of the largest high school buildings in the state.

Students at Omaha South use laptop computers and palmtops as part of their daily classroom activity. The Visual/Performing Arts program offers students the opportunity to create and perform in theatre, music, art, and filmmaking. Community partnerships include Opera Omaha and the Omaha Community Playhouse.

Extracurricular activities

Athletics
The 2013 Class A Boys Soccer State Championship, won by Omaha South High School against Creighton Prep (1-0) at Morrison Stadium, holds the current record as the highest attended soccer match in the State of Nebraska. The estimated attendance of this game was 8,200 people, beating the previous record of approximately 6,900 people held by the Creighton Men's Soccer team.

State championships

Poetry
Omaha South High Magnet school has an award winning poetry slam team as the packer poets won the 2019 Louder Than a Bomb poetry slam tournament that 40+ schools compete in. The same year a student won second place in the Individual Louder Than a Bomb poetry slam tournament. Omaha South's poetry slam team has always been ranked in the top 16 in the Midwest for the past 8 years being ranked #1 in 2015. Also, it's been a couple of times where poets from Omaha South High Magnet school had advanced in the Poetry Out Loud state finals.

Notable alumni
 Chris Bober, professional football player
 Marlin Briscoe, football player, first starting black quarterback in the NFL
 Phil Cahoy, gymnast
 Leo J. Dulacki, decorated lieutenant general in the Marine Corps
 John Faiman, former Nebraska quarterback; former Bellevue West High School head football coach
 Noah Fant, Tight End, for The Seattle Seahawks of National Football League
 Johnny Goodman, golfer, won U.S. Open in 1933, last amateur to win the title
 Jim Hartung, gymnast; on the 1984 US Olympic team, which won a gold medal
 Buddy Hunter, former Major League Baseball player (Boston Red Sox)
 Cedric Hunter, professional basketball player 
 Ed Koterba, journalist
 Jeff Koterba, editorial cartoonist, Omaha World Herald
 Oudious Lee, football player
 Darrell Mudra, football coach 
 Gail O'Brien, football player in the NFL for the Boston Redskins
 Johnny Owen, first four-sport letter winner at South and member of the Nebraska Legislature
 Dave Rimington, college and professional football player
 James R. Young, chairman and CEO of Union Pacific Railroad

See also
 Omaha Public Schools
 South Omaha

References

External links
 Omaha South High official website
 Omaha South High Class of 1998 alumni website

Omaha Public Schools
High schools in Omaha, Nebraska
Educational institutions established in 1887
South Omaha, Nebraska
Public high schools in Nebraska
Magnet schools in Nebraska
1887 establishments in Nebraska